Querube Cortinas Makalintal (December 22, 1910 – November 8, 2002) was the Chief Justice of the Supreme Court of the Philippines from 1973 to 1975 and Speaker of the Interim Batasang Pambansa from 1978 to 1984.

Early life
Makalintal was born on December 22, 1910, in San Jose, Batangas. He was born to Ambrosio Makalintal and Rufina Cortinas. He finished his Associate in Arts and Bachelor of Law at the University of the Philippines, where he was a member of the Upsilon Sigma Phi fraternity. He placed 7th in the 1933 Bar Examinations and 3rd in the 1934 Law Clerk Examinations by Civil Service.

Career
Makalintal was appointed Solicitor General in 1952. He then served as Associate Justice and Presiding Justice of the Court of Appeals.

On May 23, 1962, he was appointed Associate Justice of the Supreme Court by President Diosdado Macapagal. On October 24, 1973, he was appointed Chief Justice of the Supreme Court under President Ferdinand Marcos.

After reaching the compulsory retirement age of 65 under the 1973 Constitution, he served as Speaker of the Interim Batasang Pambansa from 1978 to 1984.

Martial law years

Makalintal, together with Justice Fred Ruiz Castro, was the "swing vote" in the Ratification Cases which upheld the 1973 Constitution, which paved the way of extending Marcos' regime. When the question of whether the petitioners are entitled to relief, the two justices answered "No", thus upholding the 1973 Constitution and made legitimate the rule of Marcos and his power.

In the cases denying Benigno Aquino Jr. of his privilege of the writ of habeas corpus, the decision of the High Court was not a traditional sense of consensus on both the conclusions and the reasons for the conclusions. Makalintal, as Chief Justice, delivered the summary of votes, and explained the reason why there was no collegial opinion by the Court. He said, among others, that the justices of the Supreme Court are conscious of "the future verdict of history" upon their stand.

Benigno Aquino Jr. warned of such verdict of history, as he aptly said, "Today, you are my judges. Tomorrow, history will judge you."

Death 
Makalintal died on November 8, 2002, in Manila, Philippines. He was 91.

He is survived by his children Eduardo, Maria Socorro, and Ambrosio.

References

 Aquino v. Enrile, G.R. No. L-35546, September 17, 1974. Supreme Court Reports Annotated, Volume 59, pp. 183. Central Law Book Publishing, Manila
 Bernas, Joaquin (2003). The 1987 Constitution of the Republic of the Philippines: a Commentary. Rex Book Store, Manila
 Cruz, Isagani A. (2000). Res Gestae: A Brief History of the Supreme Court. Rex Book Store, Manila
 Mijares, Primitivo(1976). The Conjugal Dictatorship of Ferdinand and Imelda Marcos, Union Square Publications, San Francisco, U.S.A.

1910 births
2002 deaths
Chief justices of the Supreme Court of the Philippines
Associate Justices of the Supreme Court of the Philippines
Solicitors General of the Philippines
University of the Philippines alumni
20th-century Filipino judges
Filipino educators
People from Manila
Kilusang Bagong Lipunan politicians
Speakers of the House of Representatives of the Philippines
Members of the House of Representatives of the Philippines from Metro Manila
Magsaysay administration personnel
Members of the Batasang Pambansa
Justices of the Court of Appeals of the Philippines